Coleodesmium may refer to:
 Coleodesmium (worm), a genus of worms in the family Torquaratoridae
 Coleodesmium (alga), a genus of algae in the family Microchaetaceae